Melaleuca ctenoides is a shrub in the myrtle family, Myrtaceae and is endemic to the south-west of Western Australia. It was first described in 1990 in a review of the genus Melaleuca when the species M. laxiflora at that time was found to comprise ten species. Two of those species were new - M. camptoclada and M. ctenoides. It similar to Melaleuca laxiflora but distinguished from it by its comb-like leaves and attractive mauve or violet flowers in spring.

Description
Its leaves and branches are glabrous or almost so.

Mauve flowers occur in spikes on side branches which continue to grow after flowering. The stamens are arranged in five bundles around the flower with 14 to 18 stamens in each bundle.

Taxonomy and naming
Melaleuca ctenoides was first formally described in 1990 by F.C.Quinn from a specimen found  by road north of Wongan Hills. The specific epithet (ctenoides) is from the Greek ctenos meaning "comb" and -oides, "resembling", referring to the appearance of new growth with young leaves projecting like the teeth of a comb.

Distribution and habitat
This melaleuca occurs between the Maya, Narembeen and Hyden districts in the Avon Wheatbelt, Coolgardie and Mallee biogeographic regions. It grows in sandy or clay soils on hillsides and granite outcrops.

Conservation status
Melaleuca ctenoides is listed as "not threatened" by the Government of Western Australia Department of Parks and Wildlife.

References

ctenoides
Plants described in 1990
Myrtales of Australia
Endemic flora of Western Australia